Amadou Karim Gaye  (November 8, 1913 – October 2, 2000) was a Senegalese  veterinarian, physician and politician from Saint-Louis. He served as Foreign Minister of Senegal from 1968–1972.

References
Babacar Ndiaye et Waly Ndiaye, Présidents et ministres de la République du Sénégal, Dakar, 2006 (2e éd.)

Foreign ministers of Senegal
Government ministers of Senegal
1913 births
2000 deaths
Senegalese veterinarians
Senegalese physicians
Senegalese politicians
People from Saint-Louis, Senegal
Organisation of Islamic Cooperation officials